This page shows the results of the Bowling Competition for men and women at the 1995 Pan American Games, held from March 11 to March 26, 1995, in Mar del Plata, Argentina. The event was included for the third time at the Pan American Games.

Men's competition

Singles

Doubles

Teams

All-Events

Women's competition

Singles

Doubles

Teams

All-Events

Medal table

References
 Sports 123
 bowlingdigital

Events at the 1995 Pan American Games
1995
1995 in bowling